The 1924 United States Senate election in Maine was held on September 8, 1924. Incumbent Republican U.S. Senator Bert Fernald overcame a challenge from U.S. Representative Frank E. Guernsey in the Republican primary. In the general election, Fernald was re-elected to a second term in office over Democratic newspaperman Fulton J. Redman.

Republican primary

Candidates
Bert Fernald, incumbent Senator since 1916
Frank E. Guernsey, U.S. Representative from Dover
Louis A. Jack, former President of the Maine Board of Trade and candidate for Governor in 1920

Results

Democratic primary

Candidates
Fulton J. Redman, newspaper editor and former State Representative from Bar Harbor

Results
Redman was unopposed for the Democratic nomination.

General election

Results

See also 
 1924 United States Senate elections

References

Maine
1924